Tribalus is a genus of beetles belonging to the family Histeridae. There are seven species occurring in the western Palaearctic. Apart from that, most species are distributed throughout Oriental and African regions.

Species
 
 Tribalus acceptus Marseul, 1864
 Tribalus agrestis Marseul, 1855
 Tribalus algericus Olexa, 1980
 Tribalus amnicola Lewis, 1900
 Tribalus anatolicus Olexa, 1980
 Tribalus andrei Vienna, 1994
 Tribalus andreinii G.Müller, 1938
 Tribalus ascaphus Marseul, 1869
 Tribalus asiaticus Mazur, 1987
 Tribalus atlantis Yélamos, 1991
 Tribalus australis (MacLeay, 1871)
 Tribalus bicarinatus Lewis, 1908
 Tribalus bomba Marseul, 1871
 Tribalus brevisternus Vienna, 1993
 Tribalus brouni (Broun, 1880)
 Tribalus capensis (Paykull, 1811)
 Tribalus catenarius Lewis, 1889
 Tribalus cavernicola Lewis, 1908
 Tribalus colobius Marseul, 1864
 Tribalus colombius Marseul, 1864
 Tribalus comes Cooman, 1955
 Tribalus corylophioides Lewis, 1891
 Tribalus crypticus Vienna, 1993
 Tribalus decellei Vienna, 1994
 Tribalus distinguendus G.Müller, 1938
 Tribalus doriae Marseul, 1871
 Tribalus eggersi Bickhardt, 1921
 Tribalus elapsus Vienna, 1993
 Tribalus endroedyi Vienna, 1993
 Tribalus espanyoli Yélamos & Vienna, 1995
 Tribalus excellens Vienna, 1993
 Tribalus exilis (Paykull, 1811)
 Tribalus fastigiatus Marseul, 1881
 Tribalus floridus Vienna, 1993
 Tribalus folliardi Gomy & Aberlenc, 2006
 Tribalus foveolatus Vienna, 1993
 Tribalus freyi G.Müller, 1937
 Tribalus gioiellae Vienna, 1993
 Tribalus gracilipes Vienna, 1993
 Tribalus hornii Lewis, 1901
 Tribalus impressibasis Bickhardt, 1921
 Tribalus inopinatus Vienna, 1993
 Tribalus interruptus Vienna, 1993
 Tribalus kanaari Vienna, 1993
 Tribalus kochi Thérond, 1965
 Tribalus koenigius Marseul, 1864
 Tribalus kovariki Vienna, 1993
 Tribalus laevidorsis Lewis, 1908
 Tribalus leleupi Thérond, 1965
 Tribalus longipes Vienna, 1993
 Tribalus margiventer Mazur, 1975
 Tribalus maroccanus Olexa, 1980
 Tribalus marseuli Gomy, 1985
 Tribalus micros Mazur, 1979
 Tribalus minimus (P.Rossi, 1790)
 Tribalus minutulus Thérond, 1961
 Tribalus modicus Cooman, 1955
 Tribalus montanus Lewis, 1885
 Tribalus namibiensis Yélamos & Vienna, 1995
 Tribalus nitens Vienna, 1993
 Tribalus oblongus Vienna, 1993
 Tribalus ogieri Marseul, 1864
 Tribalus olexai Lackner, 2004
 Tribalus onustus Lewis, 1892
 Tribalus opimus Lewis, 1892
 Tribalus pakistanicus Mazur, 1987
 Tribalus phyllobius (Broun, 1914)
 Tribalus politus Vienna, 1993
 Tribalus pseudostrialis Mazur, 1975
 Tribalus pumilio Schmidt, 1895
 Tribalus puncticeps Lewis, 1908
 Tribalus punctillatus Bickhardt, 1913
 Tribalus rattii Vienna, 1993
 Tribalus rougemonti Gomy, 2004
 Tribalus rubriculus Schmidt, 1890
 Tribalus scaphidiformis (Illiger, 1807)
 Tribalus similis Vienna, 1993
 Tribalus subdolus Vienna, 1993
 Tribalus subfasciatus Vienna, 1993
 Tribalus suturalis Lewis, 1908
 Tribalus tibialis Vienna, 1993
 Tribalus tropicus Lewis, 1885
 Tribalus uhligi Yélamos & Vienna, 1995
 Tribalus unistrius Lewis, 1908
 Tribalus vitalisi Desbordes, 1920
 Tribalus yamauchii Ôhara, 1999

References

Histeridae